The Golden Vanity may refer to:

 An alternative name for the traditional folk song "The Sweet Trinity"
 The Golden Vanity (Britten), a 1966 setting of the traditional folk song by Benjamin Britten

See also 
 Golden Vanity, a 1976 folk album by Martin Simpson